York-Oyster Bed is a former provincial electoral district for the Legislative Assembly of Prince Edward Island, Canada, which was represented from 2007 to 2019. The district was named Stanhope-East Royalty from 1996 until 2007.

Members
The riding has elected the following Members of the Legislative Assembly:

Election results

York-Oyster Bed, 2007–2019

Stanhope-East Royalty, 1996–2007

2016 electoral reform plebiscite results

References

 York-Oyster Bed information

Former provincial electoral districts of Prince Edward Island